Pterolophia subtincta is a species of beetle in the family Cerambycidae. It was described by Francis Polkinghorne Pascoe in 1865. It is known from Java, Vietnam, and Borneo.

References

subtincta
Beetles described in 1865